Cornelius Chirchir (born 5 June 1983 in Bomet) is a Kenyan runner who specializes in the 1500 metres. He holds the world junior record over the distance with 3:30.24 minutes, achieved on 19 July 2002 in Monte Carlo. He came close to the record in 2004 with 3:30.60 min, but never since.

He is based at the PACE Sports Management camp in Kaptagat.

Achievements

Personal bests
800 metres - 1:44.98 min (2001)
1500 metres - 3:30.24 min (2002)
One mile - 3:50.40 min (2003)

External links

Pace Sports Management

1983 births
Living people
Kenyan male middle-distance runners